Bobby Duncan is the name of:

Bobby Duncan (footballer, born 1945), Scottish footballer
Bobby Duncan (footballer, born 2001), English footballer